Dione (minor planet designation: 106 Dione) is a large main-belt asteroid. It probably has a composition similar to 1 Ceres. It was discovered by J. C. Watson on October 10, 1868, and named after Dione, a Titaness in Greek mythology who was sometimes said to have been the mother of Aphrodite, the Greek goddess of love and beauty. It is listed as a member of the Hecuba group of asteroids that orbit near the 2:1 mean-motion resonance with Jupiter. The orbital period for this object is 5.66 years and it has an eccentricity of 0.17.

Dione was observed to occult a dim star on January 19, 1983, by observers in Denmark, Germany and the Netherlands.

Photometric observations of this asteroid collected during 2004–2005 show a rotation period of  hours with a brightness variation of  magnitude. It is classified as a rare G-type asteroid, suggesting it has a carbonaceous composition with phyllosilicate minerals also being detected.

One of Saturn's satellites is also named Dione.

References

External links 
 
 

000106
000106
000106
Discoveries by James Craig Watson
Named minor planets
000106
18681010